Rockin' is a 1957 album by Frankie Laine which reached No.13 on the US album chart. Laine was backed by the Paul Weston Orchestra.

Track listing
By the River Ste. Marie
Black and Blue
That's My Desire
Blue Turning Grey Over You
That Lucky Old Sun
That Ain't Right
Shine
Rockin' Chair
We'll Be Together Again
West End Blues
Give Me a Kiss for tomorrow
On the Sunny Side of the Street

References

Frankie Laine albums
1957 albums